The plantar calcaneocuboid ligament (short calcaneocuboid ligament; short plantar ligament) is a ligament on the bottom of the foot that connects the calcaneus to the cuboid bone.  It lies deep to the long plantar ligament.

Structure
The plantar calcaneocuboid ligament lies nearer to the bones than the long plantar ligament, from which it is separated by a little areolar tissue.

It is a short but wide band of great strength, and extends from the anterior tubercle of calcaneus and the depression in front of it, on the forepart of the plantar surface of the calcaneus, to the plantar surface of the cuboid posterior to the groove for the fibularis longus tendon.

See also
 Arches of the foot
 Long plantar ligament
 Plantar calcaneonavicular ligament

References

External links
 
 Image at gla.ac.uk

Ligaments of the lower limb